The Roman Catholic Diocese of Mallorca is a diocese located in the city of Palma, Majorca in the Ecclesiastical province of Valencia in Spain.

History
 450: Established as Diocese of Majorca 
 1237: Restored as Diocese of Majorca from Diocese of Barcelona

Special churches
Minor Basilicas:
Basílica de Nostra Senyora de Lluc, Mallorca, Illes Balears 
Basílica de Sant Francesc, Palma, Illes Balears

Leadership
Raimundo Torrelles (12 Oct 1238 – 11 Jun 1266 Died) 
Pedro Morella (4 Oct 1266 – 1282 Died) 
. . .
Guillermo Vilanova (15 Mar 1304 – 1318 Died) 
Guido Terrena, O. Carm. (15 Apr 1321 – 27 Jul 1332 Appointed, Bishop of Elne) 
Berenguer Battle (27 Jul 1332 – 1 Nov 1349 Died) 
. . .
Antonio Galiana (5 Jul 1363 – 9 Apr 1375 Died) 
. . .
Francesco Climent Sapera (Pérez Clemente) (17 Aug 1403 – 20 Jun 1407 Appointed, Bishop of Tortosa) 
. . .
Francesco Ferrer (13 Feb 1467 – 17 Jun 1475 Died) 
. . .
Rodrigo de Borja (9 Oct 1489 – 11 Aug 1492 Elected, Pope) 
Giovanni Battista Savelli (31 Aug 1492 – 27 Mar 1493 Resigned) 
Guillermo Ramón de Moncada (1493 – 16 Mar 1496 Appointed, Bishop of Tarazona) 
Antonio de Rojas Manrique (1496–1507 Appointed, Archbishop of Granada)
Diego Ribera de Toledo (22 Dec 1507 – 29 Oct 1511 Appointed, Bishop of Segovia)
Rodrigo Sánchez Mercado (29 Oct 1511 – 12 Jan 1530 Appointed, Bishop of Ávila)
Agostino de Grimaldis (1530–1532)
. . .
Juan Bautista Campeggio (30 May 1539 – 4 Nov 1558 Resigned) 
Diego Arnedo (19 Sep 1561 – 17 Oct 1572 Appointed, Bishop of Huesca) 
Juan Vich Manrique de Lara (31 Jul 1573 – 10 May 1604 Appointed, Archbishop of Tarragona) 
Alfonso Laso Sedeño (1 Dec 1604 – 21 Aug 1607 Died)
Simón Vicente Bauzá, O.P. (7 Jan 1608 – 5 Dec 1625 Died) 
Félix Guzmán (21 May 1625 – 5 Jun 1625 Died) 
Baltasar Borja (15 Sep 1625 – 11 Jul 1630 Died) 
Juan de Santander, O.F.M. (10 Feb 1631 – 24 Jan 1644 Died) 
Tomás Rocamora, O.P. (14 Nov 1644 – 15 Nov 1653 Died) 
Miguel Pérez de Nueros (14 May 1655 – 12 Feb 1656 Died) 
Diego Escolano y Ledesma (26 Jun 1656 – 19 Jul 1660 Appointed, Bishop of Tarazona) 
Pedro-Fernando Manjarrés de Heredia (6 Dec 1660 – 26 Dec 1670 Died) 
Bernardo Luis Cotoner (28 Sep 1671 – 18 Jan 1684 Died) 
Pedro de Alagón y de Cardona (2 Oct 1684 – 3 May 1701 Died) 
Francisco Antonio de la Portilla, O.F.M. (12 May 1702 – 7 Jun 1711 Died) 
Atanasio Esterriga Trajanáuregui (1 Jun 1712 – 5 Jul 1721 Died) 
Juan Fernández Zapata (1 Jun 1722 – 3 Aug 1729 Confirmed, Bishop of León) 
Benito Pañelles Escardó, O.S.B. (24 Jul 1730 – 26 Nov 1743 Died) 
José Cepeda (13 Jul 1744 – 17 Jan 1750 Died) 
Lorenzo Despuig Cotoner (27 Apr 1750 – 18 Jul 1763 Appointed, Archbishop of Tarragona) 
Francisco Garrido de la Vega (18 Jul 1763 – 30 Mar 1772 Appointed, Bishop of Córdoba) 
Juan Díaz de La Guerra (22 Jun 1772 – 23 Jun 1777 Appointed, Bishop of Sigüenza) 
Pedro Rubio-Benedicto Herrero (30 Mar 1778 – 21 Feb 1794 Appointed, Bishop of Jaén) 
Bernardo Nadal Crespí (12 Sep 1794 – 12 Dec 1818 Died) 
Pedro González Vallejo (27 Sep 1819 – 25 Jun 1825 Resigned) 
Antonio Pérez de Hirias (27 Jun 1825 – 18 Dec 1842 Died) 
Rafael Manso (17 Dec 1847 – 17 Feb 1851 Appointed, Bishop of Zamora) 
Miguel Salvá y Munar (5 Sep 1851 – 4 Nov 1873 Died) 
Mateo Jaume y Garau (17 Sep 1875 – 19 Feb 1886 Died) 
Jacinto María Cervera y Cervera (10 Jun 1886 – 14 Nov 1897 Died) 
Pedro Juan Campins y Barceló (4 May 1898 – 23 Feb 1915 Died) 
Rigoberto Domenech y Valls (5 May 1916 – 16 Dec 1924 Appointed, Archbishop of Zaragoza) 
Gabriel Llompart y Jaume Santandreu (30 Apr 1925 – 9 Dec 1928 Died) 
José Miralles y Sbert (13 Mar 1930 – 23 Dec 1947 Died) 
Juan Hervás y Benet (22 Dec 1947 – 14 Mar 1955 Appointed, Prelate of Ciudad Real) 
Jesús Enciso Viana (30 May 1955 – 21 Sep 1964 Died) 
Rafael Alvarez Lara (10 Mar 1965 – 13 Apr 1973 Resigned) 
Teodoro Ubeda Gramage (13 Apr 1973 – 18 May 2003 Died) 
Jesús Murgui Soriano (27 Dec 2003 – 27 Jul 2012 Appointed, Bishop of Orihuela-Alicante) 
Javier Salinas Viñals (16 Nov 2012 – 8 Sep 2016); named Auxiliary Bishop of the Roman Catholic Archdiocese of Valencia, in Valencia, Spain, by Pope Francis; Auxiliary Bishop Sebastià Taltavull Anglada of the Roman Catholic Archdiocese of Barcelona, in Barcelona, Spain, was named Apostolic Administrator

See also
Roman Catholicism in Spain

Sources
 GCatholic.org
 Catholic Hierarchy
  Diocese website

Roman Catholic dioceses in Spain
Dioceses established in the 5th century
Religious organizations established in the 1230s
Roman Catholic dioceses established in the 13th century